Thongor is a character in a series of sword-and-sorcery novels and stories written by Lin Carter, stylized after Conan the Barbarian and set in ancient Lemuria. The character was picked up by Marvel Comics in the 1970s for its series Creatures on the Loose which saw some of Carter's stories adapted, as well as the author himself contributing to later issues.

Bibliography
The Wizard of Lemuria (1965) – later revised and expanded as Thongor and the Wizard of Lemuria (1969)
Thongor of Lemuria (1966) – later released as Thongor and the Dragon City (1970)
Thongor Against the Gods (1967)
Thongor in the City of Magicians (1968)
Thongor at the End of Time (1968)
Thongor Fights the Pirates of Tarakus (1970)
Young Thongor (2012) – consisting of stories by Lin Carter, Robert M. Price and Adrian Cole
The Sword of Thongor (2016) – consisting of stories by Robert M. Price, some based on material by Carter
 How Thongor Conquered Zaremm – short story by Robert M. Price. Published in Lin Carter's Simrana Cycle (2018)
 Thongor in the Valley of Demons – short story by Robert M. Price. Published in The Mighty Warriors (2018)

Adaptations
In 1978 a Thongor film was said to be in production for release in 1979. Titled Thongor in the Valley of Demons, the project was later cancelled.

References

External links
 
 
Thongor's profile in the Appendix to the Marvel Handbook

 
Book series introduced in 1965
Lemuria (continent) in fiction
Fantasy books by series
Fictional swordfighters
Literary characters introduced in 1965
Male characters in literature
Novels adapted into comics